Mbinga is a town and ward in the Ruvuma Region of southwestern Tanzania. It is located along the A19 road, to the northeast of Ndengo and southwest of Kigonsera.

References

Wards of Ruvuma Region

de:Mbinga
sw:Wilaya ya Mbinga